The Palomino Islands (Spanish: Islas Palomino), also called Palominos Islets are a group of small islands off the coast of Callao, Peru. Home to a large population of sea lions and seabirds, it has become a popular tourist area.

Location
The archipelago consists of four small islets located 6 miles west of the port city of Callao, at the western coast of San Lorenzo Island.

Tourism
The islands make up a tourist area where it can see a significant amount of sea lions living in its natural habitat. The islands are home to large colonies of seabird. In its coasts can be found gulls, guanayes, zarcillos, boobies, Peruvian pelicans, patillos and red-legged cormorant.

In the highest part of the island is located an old lighthouse who served as guides of ships and steamers who frequented the port of Callao . On the island is also seen a water passage that is known as the Catedral de las Islas Palomino.

See also
 List of islands of Peru
 Geography of Peru

References

External links 
 Palomino Islands in Google Maps
 peruecologico.com.pe (In Spanish)

Palomino